Burras House is a historic home located at Jamesville, Martin County, North Carolina. It dates to the early-19th century, and is a -story, five bay, rectangular vernacular Federal style frame cottage.  It has a gable roof and shed roofed front porch with vernacular, Doric order-type porch posts.

It was added to the National Register of Historic Places in 1978.

References

Houses on the National Register of Historic Places in North Carolina
Federal architecture in North Carolina
Houses in Martin County, North Carolina
National Register of Historic Places in Martin County, North Carolina